The  was established in 1956 and serves as the regulatory body for nuclear power in Japan.  The Atomic Energy Basic Law contained a provision for its creation, and shortly after the law was enacted, the organization started activities, which are stated to be: assure that research and use of nuclear power is conducted safely and with peaceful intentions, and construct plans for the use and development of nuclear power.  It is now structured with 3 different committee members as commission of inquiry to the Cabinet Office.

The AEC is located in Kasumigaseki, Chiyoda, Tokyo.

See also
Agency for Natural Resources and Energy
International Nuclear Regulators' Association
Japanese Nuclear Safety Commission
Nuclear Power in Japan
Nuclear Safety

On Japanese nuclear incidents and accidents:
2011 Japanese nuclear accidents
Fukushima Daiichi nuclear disaster
Japanese reaction to Fukushima Daiichi nuclear disaster
Japanese nuclear incidents
Radiation effects from Fukushima Daiichi nuclear disaster

References

External links
原子力委員会 Official Site

Nuclear regulatory organizations
Nuclear technology organizations of Japan
Fukushima Daiichi nuclear disaster
Governmental nuclear organizations